Harav or Harov (also Garov) is a village de facto in the Askeran Province of the breakaway Republic of Artsakh, de jure in the Khojaly District of Azerbaijan, in the disputed region of Nagorno-Karabakh. The village has an ethnic Armenian-majority population, and also had an Armenian majority in 1989.

History 
During the Soviet period, the village was a part of the Askeran District of the Nagorno-Karabakh Autonomous Oblast.

Historical heritage sites 
Historical heritage sites in and around the village include a 13th-century khachkar, the 16th/17th-century monastery-fortress of Bovurkhan, a 17th/18th-century cemetery, and the St. Mesrop Church built in 1795.

Economy and culture 
The population is mainly engaged in agriculture and animal husbandry. As of 2015, the village has a municipal building, a house of culture, a secondary school, a kindergarten, and a medical centre.

Demographics 
The village had 300 inhabitants in 2005, and 324 inhabitants in 2015.

References

External links 
 
 

Populated places in Khojaly District
Populated places in Askeran Province